Chérencé may refer to the following communes in France:

 Chérence, in the Val-d'Oise department
 Chérencé-le-Héron, in the Manche department
 Chérencé-le-Roussel, in the Manche department

See also
 Chérancé (disambiguation)